Sentimental is the seventh studio album by Tanita Tikaram, released in 2005. The album was released only on the French label Naïve Records.

Background
After releasing her previous album The Cappuccino Songs in 1998, Tikaram retired from the music scene and lived in Italy for a time. During the 7 year-gap between albums, she tried to start an album in the more electronic vein of her last, but she decided it wasn't working and then went on to study piano for three years, an instrument she had never learnt to play. Her piano teacher, Daniela Ronconi, eventually played several instruments on the album, as well as arranging and mixing the songs.

Sentimental sees Tikaram playing the piano on a record for the first time in her career, and not her usual instrument of choice, the guitar. She eventually decided to record the songs in a warmer, live-in-studio approach without any electronic overdubs and with her voice and the piano as the focal points. The result is Tikaram's jazziest album of her career. Tikaram described the album's sound as "groovy" without being exaggerated.

For the first time on her albums, Tikaram duetted with male singers. The record's drummer, Robert Treherne, who had never sung on record, duets with Tikaram on "Everyday Is New" and "Forever", because Tikaram heard him sing the latter song before a rehearsal and decided his voice complemented hers perfectly. Treherne, a longtime collaborator with singer Nick Lowe, brought the singer to duet with Tikaram on another song, "Don't Let the Cold". Lowe also provides a humming on "Don't Shake Me Up".

Release
Tikaram, who was without a record contract, signed with French independent label Naïve Records to release the album, who distributed the record around continental Europe in April 2005. Label V2 Records released the album in the UK two months later, on June 13. The album, like her previous one, was not released in the USA.

Three singles were released from the album, although none received a commercial release. The lead single of the album, the duet with Nick Lowe "Don't Let The Cold", was released as a promotional single all around Europe to radios and a videoclip was filmed to promote it. "Play Me Again" was released as a promotional single in France, and an edited version of "Everyday Is New" was released as a radio single in Scandinavia.

Critical reception

On its release, Nick Coleman of The Independent described Sentimental as a "small-scale, intimate, unfussed and unfussy treatise on the stuff of love". He added, "It's jazzy and rather solemn – both governed by the singer's soft-fingered piano style – but not in any annoying sense, and the wheezy-brown contralto that is her other special feature is just lovely."

Track listing 
All words and music by Tanita Tikaram.
 "Something New"
 "Play Me Again"
 "My Love"
 "Don't Shake Me Up"
 "Everyday Is New"
 "Love Is Just A Word"
 "Don't Let The Cold"
 "Forever"
 "Got To Give You Up"
 "Heart in Winter"

Charts

Credits
Partial list
Giorgio Babbini – Clarinet (Bass)  
Carlo Bombardi – Trombone  
Giacomo Boschi – Assistant Engineer  
Jack Brockbank – Assistant Engineer  
Neil Brockbank – Engineer, Guitar (Bass), Mixing, Producer  
Mark Creswell – Guitar (Acoustic), Guitar (Bass), Guitar (Electric)  
Alessandro Culiani – Cello  
Raj Das – Assistant Engineer  
Alberto DeStefani – Violin  
Di Marzio, Laura – Violin  
Giuseppe Zanca - trumpet

References

2005 albums
Tanita Tikaram albums
Naïve Records albums